Julián Brea (born 10 October 1999) is an Argentine professional footballer who plays as a forward for Sarmiento.

Club career
Brea embarked on his senior career with Sarmiento, after signing with the club in 2016 following a fourteen-year stint with Atlético Charlone. He made the breakthrough during the 2017–18 season, initially as an unused substitute against Nueva Chicago in November 2017 prior to making his debut in a 1–0 win over Aldosivi on 24 March 2018. A second appearance against All Boys followed a week later, in a season which the team ended in fifth place.

International career
In 2017, Brea trained with the Argentina U20s; including against the senior side.

Career statistics
.

References

External links

1999 births
Living people
Sportspeople from Buenos Aires Province
Argentine footballers
Argentine expatriate footballers
Association football forwards
Primera Nacional players
Club Atlético Sarmiento footballers
C.D. Huachipato footballers
Chilean Primera División players
Expatriate footballers in Chile